Allen Morgan (8 July 1761 – 7 August 1830) was an Anglican priest in Ireland in the nineteenth century.

Morgan was born in Dublin and educated at Trinity College Dublin. He was Dean of Killaloe from 1828 until his death.

Notes

1761 births
1830 deaths
Alumni of Trinity College Dublin
Deans of Killaloe
19th-century Irish Anglican priests
Christian clergy from Dublin (city)